The 2022 Capricorn Women's Tri-Series was a Women's Twenty20 International (WT20I) cricket tournament that was held in Namibia in April 2022. The participating teams were the hosts Namibia, along with Uganda and Zimbabwe. The tournament consisted of a triple round-robin stage followed by a final between the top two teams. The series was the first as head coach of Zimbabwe Women for former international cricketer Gary Brent.

Namibia won the opening match of the series, against Zimbabwe, by seven wickets, to record their first ever win against a Full Member side. On day two of the series, Uganda lost both of their matches, the first by twelve runs to Namibia, and then by eight runs to Zimbabwe. Zimbabwe defeated Uganda again on day three, this time by 22 runs, despite a controversial dismissal of Zimbabwean captain Mary-Ann Musonda for obstructing the field. On the fourth day, Zimbabwe bowled out the hosts for only 41 runs before securing a win by nine wickets. Namibia were bowled out cheaply again in the afternoon, this time for 68, but were still able to defeat Uganda by 28 runs thanks to a first five-wicket haul for Sune Wittmann. Zimbabwe rotated their squad for their final round-robin game, in which Josephine Nkomo took the captaincy in a win by 11 runs over Uganda. Later on day five, Zimbabwe recorded their highest WT20I partnership, with openers Sharne Mayers and Kelis Ndlovu adding an unbeaten 156 runs in a 67-run win over Namibia.

Following the conclusion of the round-robin matches, Zimbabwe and Namibia had advanced to the final of the series. Zimbabwe won the final by seven wickets, with Nomvelo Sibanda taking a hat-trick and a five-wicket haul.

Squads

Round-robin

Points table

 Qualified for the final

Fixtures

Final

Notes

References

External links
 Series home at ESPNcricinfo

Associate international cricket competitions in 2021–22
Capricorn Women's Tri-Series